Message is the second studio album by Japanese singer and songwriter Aiko Kitahara. It was released on May 11, 2005, through Giza Studio.

The album consists of three previous released singles, such as Omoide ni Sukuwaretemo, Da Da Da and Fuyu Urara. Omoide ni Sukuwaretemo had received renewed version under title album mix.

The album charted at #41 on the Oricon charts in its first week. It charted for two weeks.

Track listing

In media
Omoide ni Sukuwaretemo – ending theme for Yomiuri TV program Pro no Doumyaku.
Da Da Da – ending theme for Tokyo Broadcasting System Television program Sunday Japan
Message – ending theme for Nihon TV program Sekai! Chou Mane Kenkyuusho
Fuyu Urara – ending theme for Tokyo Broadcasting System Television program 8 Ji desu! Minna no Mondai

References

2005 albums
Aiko Kitahara albums
Being Inc. albums
Japanese-language albums
Giza Studio albums
Albums produced by Daiko Nagato